Richard Sidney Hickox  (5 March 1948 – 23 November 2008) was an English conductor of choral, orchestral and operatic music.

Early life
Hickox was born in Stokenchurch in Buckinghamshire into a musical family. After attending the Royal Grammar School, High Wycombe from 1959 to 1966, he studied at the Royal Academy of Music in London from 1966 to 1967, then was an organ scholar at Queens' College, Cambridge from 1967 to 1970.

Career
In 1967, while his father was Vicar of Wooburn, Buckinghamshire, Hickox founded the Wooburn Festival and eventually became its president. The Festival still takes place and features music, drama and the visual arts. Hickox also founded the Wooburn Singers and continued as conductor until succeeded by Stephen Jackson.

From 1970 to 1971 Hickox was Director of Music at Maidenhead Grammar School (later Desborough School). He founded the City of London Sinfonia in 1971, remaining music director until his death, and also founded the Richard Hickox Singers and Orchestra in the same year. The Richard Hickox Singers are featured on Kate Bush's album Hounds of Love on the song "Hello Earth"; the choral section is the Georgian folk song "Tsintskaro". He was the director of music at the St. Endellion Music Festival from 1972 to 2008.

In 1972, aged 24, he was appointed Martin Neary's successor as organist and master of music at St. Margaret's, Westminster (the church of the Houses of Parliament), subsequently adding the directorships of the London Symphony Chorus (1976) and Bradford Festival Choral Society (1978). From 1982 to 1990, he served as Artistic Director of the Northern Sinfonia, subsequently named as conductor emeritus. He was Associate Guest Conductor of the London Symphony Orchestra from 1985 until his death. He was Chorus Director of the London Symphony Chorus from 1976 to 1991, with whom he premiered The Three Kings by Peter Maxwell Davies in 1995. He premiered A Dance on the Hill in 2005, by the same composer. His repertoire included over 100 first performances.

In 1990, he co-founded the baroque orchestra Collegium Musicum 90 with Simon Standage. For five years, Hickox was Music Director of the Spoleto Festival, Italy. From 2000 to 2006, he was Principal Conductor of the BBC National Orchestra of Wales, thereafter becoming its Conductor Emeritus. He became the Music Director of Opera Australia in 2005. In this role he conducted the Australian premieres of The Love for Three Oranges, Rusalka, and Arabella  (which won 2008's prestigious Helpmann Award for Best Opera).

He collaborated on new productions of The Tales of Hoffmann and Alcina. CD recordings of The Love for Three Oranges and Rusalka have been released by Chandos and received very positive reviews in the international and local press. Hickox also led major revivals, including Tannhäuser, Death in Venice, Giulio Cesare, Billy Budd, and Janáček's The Makropulos Affair.

In recent years, the Australian opera singers Fiona Janes and Bruce Martin, formerly featured with Opera Australia, had left the organisation and criticised Hickox and Opera Australia for perceived declines in artistic standards since the start of Hickox's tenure.

Hickox was contracted as Opera Australia's music director through to 2012 at the time of his death in November 2008.

Hickox was appointed a Commander of the Order of the British Empire (CBE) in the 2002 Queen's Birthday Honours. His recording repertoire concentrated on British music, in which he made a number of recording premieres for Chandos Records (he made over 280 recordings for this company). In 1997 he won the Grammy Award for Best Opera Recording for his recording of Benjamin Britten's Peter Grimes.

He garnered five Gramophone Awards: for recordings of Britten's War Requiem (1992); Frederick Delius's Sea Drift (1994); William Walton's Troilus and Cressida (1995); the original 1913 version of Ralph Vaughan Williams' A London Symphony (2001 Record of the Year and Best Orchestral Disc); and Charles Villiers Stanford's Songs of the Sea (2006 Editor's Choice). He made only the second recording of Delius's Requiem (1996).

He was awarded a Doctorate of Music from Durham University in 2003 and was an Honorary Fellow of Queens' College, Cambridge. He received two Royal Philharmonic Society Music Awards, the first Sir Charles Groves Award, the Evening Standard Opera Award and the Association of British Orchestras Award. He was President of the Elgar Society.

Death
On 23 November 2008, during a recording session of Holst's First Choral Symphony for Chandos, Hickox was taken ill and died in Swansea from a dissecting thoracic aneurysm. He had been scheduled to conduct a new production of Vaughan Williams' Riders to the Sea at English National Opera later that month.

A memorial service was held at Queens' College, Cambridge, on 26 November 2008, with music conducted by Sir David Willcocks. A service of Thanksgiving took place in St Paul's Cathedral, London on 12 March 2009.

Brett Dean dedicated the fifth movement of his "Epitaph for string quintet (viola quintet) (2010)" in memory of Richard Hickox who was the conductor of the premiere of Dean's first opera, “Bliss”.

Personal life 
Hickox was married three times. In 1970 he married Julia Smith: the marriage was dissolved in 1976. His second marriage to Frances Sheldon-Williams produced a son, Tom Hickox. That marriage was also dissolved. His third marriage was to the contralto Pamela Helen Stephen with two offspring - Adam and Abigail. His son Adam became an assistant conductor in Rotterdam in 2019.  Pamela Helen Stephen died 30 November 2021.

References

External links
 London Symphony Chorus history
 Biography on Bach-cantatas.com
 Biography page from National Orchestra of Wales
 Intermusica Artists (Agent's Page)
 Chandos Records tribute

1948 births
2008 deaths
People from Wycombe District
English choral conductors
Conductors (music) who died while conducting
Commanders of the Order of the British Empire
Alumni of the Royal Academy of Music
Alumni of Queens' College, Cambridge
Fellows of Queens' College, Cambridge
People educated at the Royal Grammar School, High Wycombe
Grammy Award winners
Helpmann Award winners
Musicians from Buckinghamshire
20th-century British conductors (music)
20th-century English musicians
21st-century British conductors (music)
21st-century English musicians
English conductors (music)
British male conductors (music)
20th-century British male musicians
21st-century British male musicians
Erato Records artists